The second government of José María Aznar was formed on 28 April 2000, following the latter's election as Prime Minister of Spain by the Congress of Deputies on 26 April and his swearing-in on 27 April, as a result of the People's Party (PP) emerging as the largest parliamentary force at the 2000 Spanish general election.

The cabinet comprised members of the PP and a number of independents. It was automatically dismissed on 15 March 2004 as a consequence of the 2004 general election, but remained in acting capacity until the next government was sworn in.

Investiture

Cabinet changes
Aznar's second government saw a number of cabinet changes during its tenure:
On 28 February 2001, Jaime Mayor Oreja stepped down as Minister of the Interior in order to run as the People's Party (PP)'s leading candidate for Lehendakari in the 2001 Basque regional election. He was succeeded in his office by Mariano Rajoy, who in turn was replaced in the Presidency ministry by Juan José Lucas.
On 10 July 2002, a major cabinet reshuffle saw Ana de Palacio replacing Josep Piqué as Minister of Foreign Affairs, who in turn replaced Anna Birulés as Minister of Science and Technology. Rajoy was reassigned the Ministry of the Presidency as well as the functions of Spokesperson of the Government, with Ángel Acebes being appointed for the Interior portfolio. José María Michavila filled the vacancy left by Acebes in the Ministry of Justice, whereas President of the Valencian Government Eduardo Zaplana replaced Juan Carlos Aparicio as Minister of Labour and Social Affairs. Javier Arenas replaced Jesús Posada as Minister of Public Administrations and Ana Pastor replaced Celia Villalobos in Health and Consumer Affairs. Aznar attempted to draw Convergence and Union (CiU) into a coalition government, with little success.
On 3 March 2003, Elvira Rodríguez replaced Jaume Matas as Minister of Environment, who stepped down in order to run as the PP leading candidate for President of the Balearic Islands in the 2003 Balearic regional election.
On 4 September 2003, Josep Piqué and Mariano Rajoy were dismissed from the government as a result of being nominated as the PP leading candidates for the 2003 Catalan regional and 2004 Spanish general elections, respectively. This prompted a new reshuffle which saw Rodrigo Rato being promoted to First Deputy Prime Minister, Arenas becoming new Second Deputy Prime Minister and Minister of the Presidency, Zaplana being assigned the functions of Spokesperson of the Government, Julia García-Valdecasas becoming new Minister of Public Administrations and Juan Costa filling Piqué's vacancy in the Science and Technology ministry.

Council of Ministers
The Council of Ministers was structured into the offices for the prime minister, the two deputy prime minister, 15 ministries and the post of the spokesperson of the Government. Until July 2002, the latter's officeholder had the rank of minister without portfolio and an office of its own.

Departmental structure
José María Aznar's second government was organised into several superior and governing units, whose number, powers and hierarchical structure varied depending on the ministerial department.

Unit/body rank
() Secretary of state
() Undersecretary
() Director-general
() Autonomous agency
() Military & intelligence agency

Notes

References

External links
Governments. Juan Carlos I (20.11.1975 ...). CCHS-CSIC (in Spanish).
Governments of Spain 1996–2004. Ministers of José María Aznar. Historia Electoral.com (in Spanish).
The governments of the first period of the People's Party (1996–2004). Lluís Belenes i Rodríguez History Page (in Spanish).

2000 establishments in Spain
2004 disestablishments in Spain
Cabinets established in 2000
Cabinets disestablished in 2004
Council of Ministers (Spain)